The Bay of Pigs is an inlet of the Gulf of Cazones located on the southern coast of Cuba. By 1910, it was included in Santa Clara Province, and then instead to Las Villas Province by 1961, but in 1976, it was reassigned to Matanzas Province, when the original six provinces of Cuba were re-organized into 14 new Provinces of Cuba.

The bay is historically important for the failed Bay of Pigs Invasion of 1961. The area is a site known for its diving, with an abundance of marine fauna, e.g. 30 species of sponges belonging to 19 families and 21 genera, to be found in the bay.

Etymology 
In Cuban Spanish, cochinos may also mean the queen triggerfish (Balistes vetula), which inhabit coral reefs in Bahía de Cochinos, not swine (Sus scrofa).

Geography 

On the western side of the bay, coral reefs border the main Zapata Swamp, part of the Zapata Peninsula. On the eastern side, beaches border margins of firm ground with mangroves and extensive areas of swampland to the north and east. At the north end of the bay, the village of Buena Ventura is adjacent to Playa Larga (Long Beach).  southeast of that, Playa Girón (Giron Beach) at the village of Girón, named after the notorious French pirate Gilberto Giron (c. 1604).

History 

Playa Girón and Playa Larga were the landing sites for seaborne forces of armed Cuban exiles and the land strip for some American planes(but not many as America did not want Cuba to realize that it was American sponsored) in the Bay of Pigs Invasion, an American CIA-sponsored attempt to overthrow the new government of Cuban Prime Minister Fidel Castro in April 1961.

According to Fidel Castro's former bodyguard, the late Juan Reinaldo Sánchez, Castro lived in great luxury and had a private island called Cayo Piedra in the Bay of Pigs, replete with "mansions, guest houses, a heliport, dolphinarium, turtle lagoon, his luxury yacht Aquarama – a gift from Leonid Brezhnev – and deep-sea fishing speedboat".

Diving 

The Bay of Pigs is a relatively quiet site for diving. Dive centers exist in Playa Larga, Playa Girón and Caleta Buena. Walls of coral, caverns and a variety of fish (including the barracuda, lionfish and groupers, among others), coral and sponges can be found in the Bay of Pigs.

Biodiversity 
Surrounding the Bay of Pigs, the endemic wormlizards Amphisbaena barbouri and A. cubana have been noted. The following marine species have been registered along the eastern coast of the Bay of Pigs:

See also 
 Geography of Cuba

References

Citations

Sources

Further reading

External links 
 

Geography of Matanzas Province
Pigs
Underwater diving sites in the Caribbean